Nat Christian is a writer, director and actor.

Personal life

Christian surfed, wrote poetry and took cinema studies in college.

He and his wife, Charlotte Christian, met in 2004 at a wedding in Stillwater, MN. They got married in 2014 in Los Angeles.

Career
Christian has directed five features, including Monday Morning (2012), which he also wrote, produced, edited and co-starred (Vanguard Cinema); A socio-political drama set within the context of a Minnesota political campaign and the harsh realities of Los Angeles's homeless community, Monday Morning received a limited release at Laemmle's Music Hall. Due to its subject matter and graphically explicit footage, Monday Morning disturbed some while receiving praise from a number of critics. Because of the footage and the controversy surrounding it, the film is yet to be rated. Channels, which he also wrote (Vanguard Cinema). For Heaven's Sake (Vanguard Cinema); Club Fed (MGM DVD Cinemax, Comedy Central); "California Casanova" (MGM DVD; Cinamax) was Christian's first film which he also wrote (MGM DVD; Cinamax); and it was made when actor, Jerry Orbach (Law and Order), read the screenplay, written by Christian, and offered to play the lead role in it, which brought about the independent financing. 700 Hill, which he wrote for Monterrey Pictures, is in active development. Christian has had running roles on TV's General Hospital, The Young and the Restless and Days of Our Lives, and various other roles. He was a recipient of a Los Angeles Drama-Logue Critics Award for outstanding performance in Naomi Court. Along with his other fourteen screenplays, Nat also story consulted on "The Duke" (Buena Vista). Nat resides in Los Angeles and Minneapolis.

Filmography

Director
Monday Morning (2012) (Vanguard Cinema)
Channels (2008, Vanguard Cinema)
For Heaven's Sake (2008, Vanguard Cinema)
California Casanova (1991, MGM DVD; Cinamax)
Club Fed (1990, MGM DVD Cinemax, Comedy Central)

Actor
Monday Morning (2012)
Channels
General Hospital
The Young and the Restless
Days of Our Lives
King Kong Lives
The New Mike Hammer

Writer
Monday Morning (2012), Screenwriter (Vanguard Cinema)
Channels, Screenwriter (Vanguard Cinema)
The Duke, Story Consultant (Buena Vista Home Video)
1ST DOG, Screenwriter (co) (AppleCreek Communications)
California Casanova, Screenwriter (MGM Home Video)
700 Hill Screenwriter (Monterrey Pictures)

Producer
Monday Morning (2012), Producer (2012, Vanguard Cinema)
Channels, Producer (2008, Vanguard Cinema)
For Heaven's Sake, Producer (2008, Vanguard Cinema)
Club Fed, Co-Producer (1990, MGM DVD Cinemax, Comedy Central)

Editor
Monday Morning (2012), Editor (2012, Vanguard Cinema)
Channels, Editor (2008, Vanguard Cinema)

Songwriter
Channels, You Make Me Feel Alive - Lyricist (2008, Vanguard Cinema)

Articles
WRITTEN BY Writers Guild Of America Magazine (November 2003)

References

 
 

American male stage actors
American film directors
American male screenwriters
Living people
Year of birth missing (living people)
Place of birth missing (living people)